Tank Malling (re-released as  Beyond Soho in the UK and Crossfire in America) is a 1989 British thriller film directed by James Marcus and starring Ray Winstone. The film was written by James Marcus and Mick Southworth.

The film was released in the USA under the title Double Cross and in Canada as Double Intrigue. In the UK it was later re-released as Beyond Soho after being re-edited.

Plot 
A nightmare of vice and corruption stretching to the very heart of the Police force to the Cabinet. Tank (Ray Winstone) is an investigative reporter and jailbird, framed on scant evidence supplied by the London mob. Helen (Amanda Donohoe) is the sensuous call-girl who offers Tank ammunition and retribution. But, retaliation is swift and brutal, in the guise of Sir Robert Knight (Peter Wyngarde) and his equally lethal lawyer, Dunboyne (Jason Connery). A series of hideous murders follow as the devil protects his own.

Cast 
 Ray Winstone as John 'Tank' Malling
 Jason Connery as Dunboyne
 Amanda Donohoe as Helen Searle
 Glen Murphy as Cashman
 Marsha A. Hunt as Salena
 Peter Wyngarde as Sir Robert Knight
 John Conteh as Albert 
Terry Marsh as Curly
 Nick Berry as Joe McGrath
 John Bett as Campbell Sinclaire 
Jamie Foreman as Danny 
Don Henderson as Percy 
Maria Whittaker as Maria 
Elizabeth Hickling as Monique
Melissa Wilkes as Katy Reed
Craig Fairbrass as Jackie 
Jess Conrad as Celebrity
Carol Harrison as Sonia
Paula Ann Bland as Stripper
Jimmy Batten as Security Guard

Legacy 
The film was received to critical acclaim in 1989 and proved to be pivotal in the careers of many of the films actors.

The most successful legacy from the film was the soundtrack which was written by 10cc's Rick Fenn and Pink Floyd's Nick Mason and was their final album together as a working duo.

Soundtrack 

The soundtrack album for Tank Malling was written and performed by 10cc's Rick Fenn and Pink Floyd's Nick Mason. The soundtrack had one hit single, "See You in Paradise", featuring Maggie Reilly.

External links

British crime thriller films
1989 films
1980s British films